Damion Ratley (born April 16, 1995) is an American football wide receiver who is a free agent. He played college football at Texas A&M. He has played for the Cleveland Browns, New York Giants, Houston Texans, and Detroit Lions.

Early years
Ratley attended and played high school football at Yoakum High School.

College career
Ratley played two seasons for the Aggies after transferring from Blinn College. Over the course of 37 games (17 starts), Ratley caught 47 passes for 920 yards and eight touchdowns.

Professional career

Cleveland Browns
Ratley was drafted by the Cleveland Browns in the sixth round (175th overall) in the 2018 NFL Draft.

On May 6, 2018, Ratley signed a rookie contract worth about $2.575 million. It includes a signing bonus worth over $160,000. He made his NFL debut in Week 2 against the New Orleans Saints. In Week 6 against the Los Angeles Chargers, he had six receptions for 82 receiving yards for his first professional statistics.

Ratley was waived by the Browns on September 5, 2020.

New York Giants
On September 6, 2020, Ratley was claimed off waivers by the New York Giants. He was waived on October 13, 2020.

Houston Texans
On October 20, 2020, Ratley was signed to the Houston Texans practice squad. On December 28, 2020, Ratley was signed to the active roster. He was waived on March 16, 2021.

Detroit Lions
Ratley signed with the Detroit Lions on March 24, 2021. He was waived on August 30, 2021.

Dallas Cowboys
Ratley signed with the Dallas Cowboys' practice squad on September 21, 2021. He was released on November 16.

Minnesota Vikings
On December 15, 2021, Ratley was signed to the Minnesota Vikings practice squad. He was waived on December 28.

NFL career statistics

Regular season

References

External links
Damion Ratley NFL Profile
Cleveland Browns bio
Texas A&M Aggies bio

1995 births
Living people
American football wide receivers
Blinn Buccaneers football players
Cleveland Browns players
Dallas Cowboys players
Detroit Lions players
Houston Texans players
Minnesota Vikings players
New York Giants players
People from Yoakum, Texas
Players of American football from Texas
Texas A&M Aggies football players